Headley may refer to:

Places
 Headley, Basingstoke and Deane in the civil parish of Ashford Hill with Headley
 Headley, East Hampshire
 Headley Grange, Hampshire
 Headley, Surrey

Other uses 
 Headley (surname)
 Baron Headley, a title in the Peerage of Ireland
 Headley Britannia, a horse competing at CCI**** level in the sport of eventing, ridden by Lucinda Fredericks
 Headley Court, Defence Medical Rehabilitation Centre (DMRC)

See also
Hadleigh (disambiguation)
Hadley (disambiguation)
Hedley (disambiguation)